Havre Saint-Pierre Water Aerodrome  is located  east northeast of Havre-Saint-Pierre, Quebec, Canada.

See also
 Havre Saint-Pierre Airport

References

Registered aerodromes in Côte-Nord
Seaplane bases in Quebec